Jacob Canizal was the author of notes on Rashi's commentary to the Pentateuch, which were published in Perushim le-Rashi (Constantinople, 1525).

Publications

References
 

15th-century writers
Hebrew-language writers
15th-century Sephardi Jews